Kitty Hawk Life-Saving Station was a life-saving station on Kitty Hawk, on the Outer Banks of North Carolina. It was built in 1874 and put in service until 1946. The building is registered with National Register of Historic Places since October 11, 1984.

History 
The Life-saving stations like Kitty Hawk typically built after the 1857 North Carolina Hurricane. They generally consisted of a crew of seven men, a keeper who acted as a captain and six other men who volunteered because of their experience as mariners, sailors and fishermen. The station's first keeper was W.D. Tate who was replaced by a man named James R. Hobbs.

In 1911, a watch room above the second floor living quarters was added.

References

Life-Saving Service stations
Buildings and structures in Dare County, North Carolina
National Register of Historic Places in Dare County, North Carolina